World Encephalitis Day is held on February 22 each year and is designed to raise awareness of encephalitis, an inflammation of the brain. The global awareness day was created by the Encephalitis Society in October 2013 and has been held annually ever since.

2014 

The inaugural World Encephalitis Day was operated under the tagline, “Make Today your First,” and highlighted the fact that many people would hear about encephalitis for the first time when in a hospital waiting room themselves. Supporters were encouraged to share information on encephalitis to raise awareness globally.

One of those supporters was Simon Hattenstone, a survivor of encephalitis and journalist with The Guardian, who wrote: "Encephalitis is such a cruel disease because it is often misdiagnosed – even today. And that delay in diagnosis can have fatal consequences."

The Society teamed up with the Institute of Infection and Global Health at the University of Liverpool to break a world record for the “largest human image of an organ” when 687 people descended on University Square, University of Liverpool, to stand together and form the largest ever brain made out of people.

The world record attempt was choreographed by local artist Mike Badger and Daisy Solomon, the daughter of Professor Tom Solomon, the director of the institute and chair of The Society's Professional Advisory Committee.

2015 

The focus of World Encephalitis Day 2015 was to improve early diagnosis and treatment of encephalitis. Webinars hosted by leading experts in encephalitis were live streamed across five continents – each of which focused on a different form of encephalitis.
Support came from Olympic swimmer Rebecca Adlington who shared her sister's story and ended with a concert featuring Britain's Got Talent finalist Aliki Chrysochou, an ambassador with The Society, who performed in the Awakenings concert at Liverpool's Everyman Theatre.

Once again, supporters of the Society share their stories to raise awareness among the public and health professionals.

2016 

To celebrate The Society's annual theme, The Year of the Narrative, World Encephalitis Day 2016 featured a short film, digital art and photography competition, inviting supporters to create a piece of artwork that showed the world “what it needs to know about encephalitis.” The winners of each category came from the U.S. and Italy and were invited to an [ exhibition] at the Saatchi Gallery in December of that year.

The Society also encouraged supporters to share their stories with the media and wear items of red clothing on February 22 and share their photos on social media using the hashtag, #RED4WED.

2017 

The fourth annual World Encephalitis Day on February 22, 2017, reached an estimated 40 million people through traditional and social media and saw more than 50 global landmarks and buildings go #RED4WED by lighting up in the colour red to celebrate The Year of Awareness.

Buildings which were illuminated included Niagara Falls, the Millennium Bridge in Gateshead, the fountains at Trafalgar Square, the Fountain of Two Rivers in Modena, Italy, the Swan Bell Tower, Perth, and Blackpool Tower.

Supporters continued the #RED4WED campaign by wearing red clothing on February 22 and sharing their photos on social media as well as their stories with the media.

2018 
World Encephalitis Day 2018 encouraged supporters to download BrainWalk, a mobile phone app, and walk digitally around the globe by completing 52.9 million steps – the distance in steps to walk the world. In total, people from 43 different countries engaged with BrainWalk and completed over 110 million steps.

References

External links
 Encephalitis Explained from Encephalitis Society
 WHO: Viral Encephalitis

February observances
Encephalitis